David Jeremy Nicholas Appleton (born 1969) is a journalist and film director. 

Appleton attended Rockport School in Holywood, County Down, and then Campbell College in Belfast before attending Jesus College, Oxford, where he read English.

Dudi, as he has been known since a child, attended Central Acting School in London. Though he acted in plays and film, he was more attracted to writing, where he became a travel journalist for The Standard, The Guardian and The Daily Telegraph broadsheets.

Working with his Oxford companion JimKeeble, who had moved into writing books, they began writing film scripts. The first which was filmed was A Sort Of Homecoming (1994) which was a short based and filmed in Strangford Lough in County Down. As they continued to write scripts, Appleton wished to direct a full-length feature. In 1999 they made The Most Fertile Man in Ireland (set in County Donegal in west Ulster), for which he would later win the HBO Comedy award in Colorado for best director, awarded to Appleton by Billy Crystal.

He has since been writing scripts for Disney, Miramax, Warner Brothers and Scott Free and has worked with directors such as Oliver Stone and Sir Ridley Scott developing adaptations and screenplays.

References

External links

1969 births
Film directors from Northern Ireland
Living people
Journalists from Belfast
People educated at Campbell College
People educated at Rockport School
Alumni of Jesus College, Oxford
Male writers from Northern Ireland